Oak Forest is a train station located in Oak Forest, Illinois on Metra's Rock Island District line, which runs between Joliet, Illinois and LaSalle Street Station in downtown Chicago, Illinois. It is in Zone E according to Metra fee schedules based on distance from downtown Chicago. As of 2018, Oak Forest is the 42nd busiest of Metra's 236 non-downtown stations, with an average of 1,091 weekday boardings.

As of 2022, Oak Forest is served by 21 trains in each direction on weekdays, by 10 inbound trains and 11 outbound trains on Saturdays, and by eight trains in each direction on Sundays.

The station is located at 159th Street (U.S. Route 6) and Cicero Avenue (Illinois Route 50).  There are several parking lots adjacent to the station, though they are being removed and relocated further away from the train station as part of Oak Forest Mayor JoAnn Kelly's Gateway Project.

In 2011, Oak Forest, then the second-busiest station on the Rock Island line with 1,500 daily commuters and 23 trains, received a $1.3 million grant from the United States Department of Transportation for modernization.

Tracks
There are two tracks at Oak Forest. Trains from Chicago run on track 2 (the north track) and trains to Chicago run on track 1 (the south track.)

Bus connections
Pace
 354 Harvey/Oak Forest Loop 
 364 159th Street  
 383 South Cicero

References

External links

Image of Oak Forest Station (Metra Railfan Photos)
159th Street entrance from Google Maps Street View

Metra stations in Illinois
Former Chicago, Rock Island and Pacific Railroad stations
Railway stations in Cook County, Illinois
Railway stations in the United States opened in 1900